Bolbolu-ye Kalantar (also Romanized as Bolbolū-e Kalāntar; also known as Bolbolū) is a village in Ganjabad Rural District, Esmaili District, Anbarabad County, Kerman Province, Iran. At the 2006 census, its population was 216, in 41 families.

References 

Populated places in Anbarabad County